David Machado (born 1978) is a Portuguese writer. He was born in Lisbon and studied economics at ISEG Lisbon, before turning to writing as a full-time occupation. 

Machado first gained renown for his books for children, two of which won literary prizes. A Noite dos Animais Inventados won the Branquinho da Fonseca Prize in 2005, and O Tubarão na Banheira won the SPA/RTP Author Prize in 2010. In addition, he has published several novels and a short story collection titled Histórias Possíveis. In 2015, Machado won the EU Prize for Literature for his novel Indice Medio de Felicidade (Average Happiness Index).

Selected works
Children's books
 A Noite dos Animais Inventados
 O Tubarão na Banheira
 Os Quatro Comandantes da Cama Voadora
 Um Homem Verde num Buraco Muito Fundo
 A Mala Assombrada
 Parece Um Pássaro
 Acho Que Posso Ajudar 
 O meu cavalo Indomável 

Short stories
 Histórias PossíveisNovels 
 O Fabuloso Teatro do Gigante Deixem Falar as Pedras 
 Índice Médio de Felicidade''

References

1978 births
Living people
People from Lisbon
21st-century Portuguese male writers
20th-century Portuguese male writers
Portuguese male novelists
20th-century Portuguese novelists
21st-century Portuguese novelists